Following are lists of fictional locations, as large as a universe and as small as a pub. For example, the AFL team West Coast Eagles are named after a fictional city as ‘West Coast’ doesn’t actually exist.

 List of fictional bars and pubs
 list of fictional castles
 List of fictional city-states in literature
 List of fictional countries
 List of fictional countries by region
 List of fictional African countries
 List of fictional American countries
 List of fictional European countries
 List of fictional Oceanian countries
 List of fictional galactic communities
 List of fictional islands
 Planets in science fiction
 List of fictional police states
 List of fictional prisons
 List of fictional railway stations
 List of fictional rapid transit stations
 List of fictional schools
 List of fictional British and Irish universities
 List of fictional Cambridge colleges
 List of fictional Oxford colleges
 List of fictional settlements
 List of fictional towns in animation
 List of fictional towns in comics
 List of fictional towns in film
 List of fictional towns in literature
 List of fictional towns in television
 List of films featuring space stations
 List of fictional universes in animation and comics
 List of fictional shared universes in film and television
 List of fictional shared universes in video games
 List of fictional universes in literature
 List of science fiction universes
 List of fantasy worlds

See also
 Constructed world
 Fictional geography
 Lost lands

External links
 Historian of Things That Never Were

 

Lists of fictional things

pt:Lugar fictício